Streetwise may refer to:

Knowledgeable
Streetwise, possessing knowledge of youth culture, also called "street"
Streetwise, possessing know-how (practical knowledge), as opposed to ivory tower or book knowledge, knowledge on how to succeed through life, or generally how to avoid the pitfalls
Streetwise, possessing common sense, a basic understanding of things

Arts, entertainment, and media
Streetwise (1984 film), a 1984 documentary following the lives of homeless teenagers living on the streets of downtown Seattle
Streetwise (1998 film), a 1998 film
Streetwise (album), a 1991 album by American classical pianist Richard Kastle
Streetwise (TV series), a teenage courier delivery drama television series broadcast on Children's ITV between 1989 and 1992
Streetwise (Transformers), the name of several robot superhero characters in the Transformers robot superhero franchise
StreetWise, a Chicago newspaper
 Streetwise, regular character in the Quizkids magazines

Brands and enterprises
Rover Streetwise, a small hatchback made by the MG Rover Group
 StreetWise, an educational centre and charity in Bournemouth, Dorset, United Kingdom, which opened in 1998. It included a fake indoor street layout with working pedestrian crossings, a bus, train and buildings, used to teach children safety skills. Renamed later as SafeWise, it closed in 2020.

See also
Savoir faire (disambiguation)
Street Smarts, a TV game show
 Street Wisdom, an international nonprofit institution